Platyvelia is a genus of smaller water striders in the family Veliidae. There are about nine described species in Platyvelia.

Species
These nine species belong to the genus Platyvelia:
 Platyvelia alvaradana (Drake & Hottes, 1952)
 Platyvelia annulipes (Champion, 1898)
 Platyvelia beameri (Hungerford, 1929)
 Platyvelia brachialis (Stål, 1860)
 Platyvelia egregia (Drake & Harris, 1935)
 Platyvelia maritima (J. Polhemus & Manzano, 1992)
 Platyvelia summersi (Drake, 1951)
 Platyvelia verana (Drake & Hottes, 1952)
 Platyvelia verdica (Drake, 1951)

References

Further reading

 
 
 
 

Articles created by Qbugbot
Veliidae
Gerromorpha genera